Fair Game is the debut extended play (EP) by Australian rock band The Sports, released independently in 1977 and limited to 500 copies. It was produced by Joe Camilleri.

A copy of the EP made it to the UK rock publication New Musical Express who wasted no time in pronouncing it their "Record of the Week", which led to the group being signed to Mushroom Records in Australia.

All four tracks were included on the 2014 remastered and expanded 2-CD reissue of Reckless.

Track listing

Personnel
The Sports
 Steve Cummings – vocals
 Ed Bates – guitar
 Jim Niven – piano 
 Robert Glover – bass
 Paul Hitchins – drums
with:
 Joe Camilleri – saxophone

References

1977 debut EPs
The Sports albums
Albums produced by Joe Camilleri
Indie pop EPs
EPs by Australian artists